Gordon Massey Gostelow (14 May 1925 – 3 June 2007) was an Australian actor. He was educated in Australia at North Sydney Boys High School and Sydney University where he graduated in Economics.

Gostelow went to England in 1950 and worked in the theatre (regional repertory), including the Royal Shakespeare Company and various roles on British television. In Shakespeare he was especially associated with the role of the alcoholic reprobate Bardolph in the Henriad plays.  He played the character on television in both An Age of Kings in 1960 and in the BBC Television Shakespeare's version of the plays in 1979. He also played several other roles in the former production, but was said to have been "born" to play Bardolph.

He played the parts of Perks in the 1968 TV serial of The Railway Children, Milo Clancey in the Doctor Who serial The Space Pirates in 1969, and the Duke of Medina Sidonia in Elizabeth R. Between 1969 and 1970 he also narrated in twelve episodes of BBC children's television series Jackanory. In 1984, he took the part of Alf Battle in the supermarket sitcom Tripper's Day. He appeared in a 1999 episode of Midsomer Murders, entitled "Death's Shadow".

His film career included roles in Dr. Syn, Alias the Scarecrow (1963), The Idol (1966), Nicholas and Alexandra (1971), The Day Christ Died (1980, as Nicodemus), The Scarlet Pimpernel (1982), and How to Get Ahead in Advertising (1989).

Filmography

References

External links

 Programs and related material in the National Library of Australia's PROMPT collection

1925 births
2007 deaths
Australian male television actors
People from Wellington City
University of Sydney alumni